A paper street or paper road is a street or road that appears on maps but has not been built. Paper streets generally occur when city planners or subdivision developers lay out and dedicate streets that are never built.  Commercial street maps based only on official subdivision and land records may show streets which are legally public rights of way though usually undriveable.

Paper roads (also known as unformed legal roads) may exist only on paper, never having been developed, but they have a legal existence, whether on private or public land. 
They are especially common in New Zealand, where they were created primarily for future access in rural areas (though in some cases, their layout was determined without checking whether the topography was acceptable for a road). Some districts are reputed to have as many paper roads as actual, formed roads. An estimated  of paper road exists in New Zealand.

Controversies sometimes arise about ownership or use of paper roads. Property owners may feel that an abutting undeveloped paper road is part of their property, but other property owners may have rights to access via that road, access which could be developed in the future if the need arises. The presence of a paper road can affect property valuation since there may be required building setbacks from the road, which might limit development opportunities.

Paper streets (and, by extension, paper towns) may be deliberately included in published maps as trap streets, forming a copyright trap.

A play on the phrase is found in Chuck Palahniuk's novel Fight Club, as well as the film based on that book, where the protagonist lives in a house on "Paper street". Paper towns play a large role in John Green's novel Paper Towns.

See also 

 Easement
 Trap street
 Potemkin village
 Paper township

References

External links
NZ Walking Access Commission information sheet on unformed legal roads (paper roads).

Cartography
Legal fictions
Fictional streets and roads
Fictitious entries
Human geography
Real property law
Types of roads
Roads in New Zealand
Property law of New Zealand